Hamm – Unna II is an electoral constituency (German: Wahlkreis) represented in the Bundestag. It elects one member via first-past-the-post voting. Under the current constituency numbering system, it is designated as constituency 145. It is located in the Ruhr region of North Rhine-Westphalia, comprising the city of Hamm and the northern part of the district of Unna.

Hamm – Unna II was created for the 1980 federal election. Since 2013, it has been represented by Michael Thews of the Social Democratic Party (SPD).

Geography
Hamm – Unna II is located in the Ruhr region of North Rhine-Westphalia. As of the 2021 federal election, it comprises the independent city of Hamm as well as the municipalities of Lünen, Selm, and Werne from the Unna district.

History
Hamm – Unna II was created in 1980. In the 1980 through 1998 elections, it was constituency 117 in the numbering system. From 2002 through 2009, it was number 146. Since 2013, it has been number 145. Its borders have not changed since its creation.

Members
The constituency has been held continuously by the Social Democratic Party (SPD) since its creation. It was first represented by Udo Fiebig from 1980 to 1987. Dieter Wiefelspütz was then representative from 1987 to 2013. Michael Thews was elected in 2013, and re-elected in 2017 and 2021.

Election results

2021 election

2017 election

2013 election

2009 election

References

Federal electoral districts in North Rhine-Westphalia
1980 establishments in West Germany
Constituencies established in 1980
Hamm
Unna (district)